is a photographic award that has been sponsored annually by the city of Sagamihara since 2001.

There are four kinds of awards: the main prize for professionals (Sagamihara shashinshō), prizes for newcomer professionals (Sagamihara shashin shinjin shōrei-shō), one prize for Asian photographers (Sagamihara shashin Ajia-shō) (in which "Asian" is taken to exclude Japan), and various awards for amateurs (Sagamihara amachua shashin guranpuri). The winning photographs are displayed in Sagamihara Citizen's Gallery.

Notes

Sources
  Sagamihara-shi Sōgō Shashin-sai: Fotoshiti Sagamihara 2007 Kōshiki Gaidobukku.

External links
 Photo City Sagamihara

Awards established in 2001
Japanese awards
Photography awards
Photography in Japan